Duabanga is a small genus of lowland evergreen rainforest trees in southeast Asia, comprising two or three species.

Duabanga was traditionally included in the ditypic family Sonneratiaceae, but it is now classified in its own monotypic subfamily Duabangoideae of the Lythraceae.

References 
 
 

 
Lythraceae genera
Plants described in 1835